Meisserite is a very rare uranium mineral with the formula Na5(UO2)(SO4)3(SO3OH)(H2O). It is interesting in being a natural uranyl salt with hydrosulfate (hydroxysulfate) anion, a feature shared with belakovskiite. Other chemically related minerals include fermiite, oppenheimerite, natrozippeite and plášilite. Most of these uranyl sulfate minerals was originally found in the Blue Lizard mine, San Juan County, Utah, USA. The mineral is named after Swiss mineralogist Nicolas Meisser.

Association and origin
Meisserite is associated with other sulfate minerals: belakovskiite, johannite, chalcanthite, copiapite, ferrinatrite, and gypsum. It is resulting from post-mining oxidation of the primary uranium mineral - uraninite.

Crystal structure
The crystal structure of meisserite is unique. The building elements include:
 pentagonal bipyramids of uranyl groups
 SO4 groups
These elements link to form chains. Sodium cations are bonded to oxygen atoms in chains, to hydrosulfate groups and water.

References

Uranium(VI) minerals
Sulfate minerals
Sodium minerals
Triclinic minerals
Minerals in space group 2